This is a list of the main career statistics of professional German tennis player, Sabine Lisicki. Highlights of Lisicki's career include winning four WTA singles titles and a finals appearance at the 2013 Wimbledon Championships. She was also a semi-finalist at the event in 2011 and a quarterfinalist on three other occasions. Lisicki has also won three WTA doubles titles and reached the final of the 2011 Wimbledon Championships in women's doubles with Samantha Stosur as her partner.

Performance timelines

Only WTA Tour main draw (incl. Grand Slams), Fed Cup and Olympics matches are considered.

Singles
Current through the 2022 WTA Tour.

Doubles

Mixed doubles

Significant finals

Grand Slam finals

Singles: 1 (1 runner-up)

Doubles: 1 (1 runner-up)

Olympics finals

Mixed doubles: 1 bronze medal match (0–1)

WTA Premier Mandatory & Premier 5 finals

Doubles: 1 (1 title)

WTA career finals

Singles: 9 (4 titles, 5 runner-ups)

Doubles: 5 (4 titles, 1 runner-up)

Team competition: 1 (1 runner-up)

WTA 125 finals

Singles: 1 (1 runner-up)

ITF Circuit finals

Singles: 4 (2 titles, 2 runner-ups)

Doubles: 2 (2 runner-ups)

Best Grand Slam results details

Fed Cup participation
This table is current through the 2015 Fed Cup

Singles (5–6)

Doubles (5–1)

Head-to-head records

Head-to-head vs. top-10 players
Lisicki's match record against players who have been ranked in the top 10, with those who are active in boldface.

Record against No. 11–20 players
Lisicki's record against players who have been ranked world No. 11–20, with those who are active in boldface.

 Magdaléna Rybáriková 5–1
 Mirjana Lučić-Baroni 4–0
 Peng Shuai 4–0
 Petra Martić 3–0
 Elena Vesnina 3–1
 Shahar Pe'er 3–2
 Anastasija Sevastova 2–0
 Donna Vekić 2–0
 Kirsten Flipkens 2–1
 Aravane Rezaï 2–1
 Barbora Strýcová 2–1
 Elena Bovina 1–0
 Mihaela Buzărnescu 1–0
 Virginie Razzano 1–0
 Zheng Jie 1–0
 Alona Bondarenko 1–1
 Kaia Kanepi 1–1
 Magda Linette 1–1
 María José Martínez Sánchez 1–1
 Anabel Medina Garrigues 1–1
 Daria Saville 1–2
 Sybille Bammer 0–1
 Eleni Daniilidou 0–1
 Anna-Lena Grönefeld 0–1
 Ana Konjuh 0–1
 Varvara Lepchenko 0–1
 Tatiana Panova 0–1
 Alison Riske-Amritraj 0–1
 Katarina Srebotnik 0–1
 Ágnes Szávay 0–1
 Tamarine Tanasugarn 0–1
 Markéta Vondroušová 0–1
 Yanina Wickmayer 0–1
 Anastasia Pavlyuchenkova 0–2

* Statistics correct .

Wins over reigning world No. 1's

Top 10 wins
Lisicki has a  record against players who were, at the time the match was played, ranked in the top 10.

Career double bagels
A double bagel is a match won at a score of 6–0 6–0.

WTA Tour career earnings
As of 31 December 2022.

References

External links

Tennis career statistics